Sublette County School District #1 is a public school district based in Pinedale, Wyoming, United States.

Geography
Sublette County School District #1 serves most of Sublette County, with the only exception being the southwestern portion of the county (which is part of Sublette County School District #9). The following communities are served by the district:

Incorporated places
Town of Pinedale
Census-designated places (Note: All census-designated places are unincorporated.)
Bondurant
Boulder
Cora
Daniel

Schools
Pinedale High School (Grades 9–12)
Pinedale Middle School (Grades 6–8)
Bondurant Elementary School (Grades K-5)
Pinedale Elementary School (Grades K-5)

Student demographics
The following figures are as of October 1, 2008.

Total District Enrollment: 989
Student enrollment by gender
Male: 505 (51.06%)
Female: 484 (48.94%)
Student enrollment by ethnicity
White (not Hispanic): 902 (91.20%)
Hispanic: 68 (6.88%)
American Indian or Alaskan Native: 13 (1.31%)
Asian or Pacific Islander: 4 (0.40%)
Black (not Hispanic): 2 (0.20%)

See also
List of school districts in Wyoming

References

External links
Sublette County School District #1 – official site.
Pinedale Portal – Educational Portal used by students and staff.

Education in Sublette County, Wyoming
School districts in Wyoming